Keith (stylized in all caps) is the seventeenth solo studio album by American recording artist Kool Keith. It was released on July 12, 2019 through Mello Music Group. The album was produced by Psycho Les of the Beatnuts. It features guest appearances from fellow rappers B-Real, Jeru the Damaja and Paul Wall. The album was recorded at TME Studios in the Bronx and mixed by DJ Fred Ones.

Singles
The album's lead single, "Zero Fux" was released on May 14, 2019. It features Cypress Hill member B-Real. The second single, "Turn the Levels", was released on June 4, 2019.

Critical reception

Keith was met with mostly positive reviews. Paul Simpson of AllMusic writes, "Keith is simply another consistent, enjoyable album from one of rap's true legends". Guy Oddy of The Arts Desk writes, "a lyrical and beat collage that takes in social reportage on the menacing "95 South", anti-materialism on "Word Life" and racism, it also has a good deal of bragging about his prowess on the mic."

Track listing
Credits adapted from Pitchfork.

Sample credits
 "Turn the Levels" contains a sample of "Suspended Underscore", performed by Keith Mansfield.
 "Holy Water" contains a replayed sample of "I'm Gonna Love You Just a Little More Baby", performed by Barry White, from the album I've Got So Much to Give.

References

2019 albums
Kool Keith albums